Thomas Bacon may refer to:
 Thomas Bacon (academic) (died 1559), master of the then Gonville College, Cambridge
Thomas Sclater later Bacon (died 1736), MP
 Thomas Bacon (politician) (c. 1620–1697), English Member of Parliament
Thomas Bacon (judge) (fl. 1336), English justice
Thomas Bacon (priest) (1711–1768), clergyman, musician, author and publisher in Ireland, England and Maryland
Thomas M. Bacon (1803–1874), American politician
Thomas Rutherford Bacon (1850–1913), American clergyman and professor of history
Thomas Bacon (musician), 18th century musician from Annapolis, USA